

1989

See also 
 1989 in Australia
 1989 in Australian television

References

External links 
 Australian film at the Internet Movie Database

1989
Australian
Films